Perez, officially the Municipality of Perez,  is a 5th class municipality in the province of Quezon, Philippines. According to the 2020 census, it has a population of 12,767 people.

It is formerly a barrio named Sangirin, which was part of Mauban and later of Alabat in 1884. It was named as a token of gratitude to Felimon Perez, the former governor of the province who helped make this place an independent municipality in 1929.

The town is home to a few speakers of the critically endangered Inagta Alabat language, one of the most endangered languages in the world as listed by UNESCO.

Geography

Barangays
Perez is politically subdivided into 14 barangays, 4 of which are urban and the rest are rural barangays.

 Maabot 
 Mainit Norte
 Mainit Sur
 Pambuhan
 Pinagtubigan Este
 Pinagtubigan Weste
 Pagkakaisa Pob. (Barangay 1)
 Mapagmahal Pob. (Barangay 2)
 Bagong Pag-Asa Pob. (Barangay 3)
 Bagong Silang Pob. (Barangay 4)
 Rizal
 Sangirin
 Villamanzano Norte
 Villamanzano Sur

Climate

Demographics

Economy

Government

Elected officials
Municipal council (2019-2022:
Mayor: Pepito C. Reyes
Vice-Mayor: Ryan A. Panol
Councilors:
Gilbert N. Tarrega
John Dominic A. Corales
Roberto R. Buerano
Richard R. Mascarina
Santiago T. Evangelista
Victor C. Alpay
Aubrey B. Manlogon
Czarina C. Caringal

References

External links
Perez Profile at PhilAtlas.com
www.quezon.gov.ph
[ Philippine Standard Geographic Code]
Philippine Census Information
Local Governance Performance Management System

Municipalities of Quezon